Cao Jianfang (born August 1957) was a Chinese politician who served as secretary-general of the CCP Yunnan Provincial Committee between 2011 and 2015. On January 29, 2016, the Central Commission for Discipline Inspection announced he was expelled from the party and demoted.

Career
Cao Jianfang was born in Yiliang County, Kunming, Yunnan in August 1957. He graduated from Central University of Finance and Economics and joined the Communist Party in July 1976. After graduating he became the officer of Yunnan Provincial Department of Finance. In 2003, Cao served as the director of Department of Finance and party chief of Chuxiong Yi Autonomous Prefecture in 2006. He became deputy governor of Yunnan in 2008 and secretary-general of the CPC Yunnan Committee in 2011, as well as a member of the provincial Party Standing Committee.

On January 29, 2016, the Central Commission for Discipline Inspection announced Cao Jianfang was expelled from the party and demoted sub-division level (fuchuji) due to having breached discipline.

References

1957 births
Living people
Central University of Finance and Economics alumni
Chinese Communist Party politicians from Yunnan
People's Republic of China politicians from Yunnan
People from Kunming
Expelled members of the Chinese Communist Party